Shree Ganesh is an Indian Hindi-language mythological television series that aired on Sony Entertainment Television from 1 October 2000 and ended on 29 June 2003. Directed by Dheeraj Kumar, it follows the story of the Hindu god Ganesha, portrayed by Jagesh Mukati.

Plot 
The show follows the story of Lord Shiva and Parvati's son Ganesha, who is considered the remover of obstacles.

Cast 

 Jagesh Mukati as Ganesh
 Gayatri Jayaraman as the Adishakti
 Sunil Sharma Shiva
 Priyanka Puthran as Parvati
 Sandeep Mohan as Vishnu
 Shital Thakkar as Mahadevi, Lakshmi
 Arup Pal as Brahma
 Shailey Chowdhary as the devi Saraswati
 Surbhi Tiwari as the Shakti swaroopa devi, Sati 
 Sunil Nagar Daksh 
 Sameer Dharmadhikari as Indra
 Shilpa Kataria Singh as Shachi, the Swarg Maharani (queen of heaven)
 Sanjay Swaraj (Sandeep Mehta) as Narada
 Radhakrishna Dutta as Kashyapa
 Keerti Singh as the asura, Diti
 Shweta Rastogi as Aditi, an asura
 Nimai Bali as the swayambhu, Tārakāsura
 Raman Khatri as Bhayasur turned Dayasur
 Rajesh Shringarpure as Maharaj Nala
 Swati Anand as Maharani Damayanti 
 Firdaus Mevawala as the Daityaguru, Shukracharya
 Deepak Jethi as the Daityaraj, Vajranga
 Rakesh Pandey as Devguru Brihaspati 
 Kishori Shahane as Maharani Prasuti 
 Veena Sharma as Varāṅgī, wife of Vajranga
 Hansa Singh as Rakshas Kanya Shambhuki
 Vaquar Shaikh as Maharaj Chitrāngada
 Seema Pandey as Maharani Indumati
 Vinod Kapoor as Maharaj Bheema 
 Sujata Thakkar as the devi Vanvalakshi
 Qasim Ali as Pushpaka

Production 

Speaking about the series, director Dheeraj Kumar said, "Shree Ganesh is a show with many untouched aspects of Lord Ganesh which can be truly understood at dire times."

Reception 
The Tribune stated, "It triumphs due to its slick production values and neatly packaged anecdotes."

As in April 2001, it was garnering a rating of 1.9 TVR in India.

Syndication 
Star Plus, DD National, ABZY Cool acquired the broadcast rights for the series in June 2020,  during the nationwide coronavirus lockdown, as a substitute to its original programming.

References

External links 

 Shree Ganesh on IMDb

Indian television series about Hindu deities
2000 Indian television series debuts
2001 Indian television series endings
Sony Entertainment Television original programming